Crockett (formerly Crockettville) is a census-designated place (CDP) in Contra Costa County, in the East Bay sub-region of the San Francisco Bay Area, California. The population was 3,094 at the 2010 census. It is located 28 miles northeast of San Francisco. Other nearby communities include Port Costa, Martinez, Vallejo, Benicia, Rodeo, Hercules, Pinole and Richmond.

History

Crockett is located on the Mexican land grant Rancho El Pinole made to Ygnacio Martinez, and is named after Joseph B. Crockett, a judge on the California Supreme Court. The town started when Thomas Edwards Sr. bought  of land from Judge Crockett in 1866. Edwards built his home in 1867 and when other settlers arrived, he started the first general store in Crockett. Edwards' home still stands and is known as "The Old Homestead", a California Historical Landmark. Crocketville post office was established in 1883, and the name was changed to Crockett later that year.

"Sugar Town"
In 1906, an agricultural cooperative of Hawaiian sugar cane growers bought an existing Wheat Factory that never opened, refitted the facility, built additional structures for their refining needs, eventually turning Crockett into a company town for the California and Hawaiian Sugar Company, (better known as C&H).
The cane was grown in Hawaii and delivered by ship to Crockett, where the C&H refinery turned it into a variety of finished products.

C & H soon became a dominant force in Crockett, which has been called a "company town." By the 1920s, the company employed about 95 percent of the residents. Employment peaked at 2,500 just before WWII broke out. C & H helped its employees obtain land and bank loans so that they could build houses. Company architects worked on designing the houses. The company funded many school and civic programs.

In March and April 1938, Crockett experienced a labor strike at the C&H plant, climaxing in a riot.  This was prior to the merger of the AFL and CIO national unions.

Economic adaptation
By the 1960s, the good times were largely over for C & H and Crockett. Revenues and profits began dropping, so that the company pumped less money into the community. There were many layoffs as the company tried to restore profitability. In 1984, the company proposed building a natural  gas-powered cogeneration plant that would provide steam for the sugar refinery and low-cost electricity for Crockett. A protest group calling itself the Crockett Power Plant Committee, supported by many Crockett residents formed and spent the next nine years opposing the proposal.  The proposed power plant was eventually built, but only after the company agreed to make major changes. C & H agreed to give Crockett $300,000 per year for the ensuing 30 years, which mostly funds its police and volunteer fire fighting departments.

The Hawaiian sugar farmers sold their holdings in 1993 to Hawaii-based Alexander & Baldwin, which converted C & H from a co-op into a corporation. In 1998, A & B sold a controlling interest to Citicorp Venture Capital (CVC). American Sugar Refining bought C & H in 2006, merging it with its other sugar operations. Revenues and profits continued their decline into the 21st Century, until the Crockett plant processed its last shipment of Hawaiian sugar in 2017. 

Raw sugar now arrives from the globe's sun belt: Australia, the Philippines and Nicaragua, among other countries.

"Wildfire" (2019)
A wildfire burned near Crockett on October 29, 2019, the same week as multiple wildfires in the region, e.g. Sonoma County "Kirkwood Fire", and a wildfire at the north end of the Carquinez bridge in Vallejo, California.  There is some suspicion that strong northerly wind then caused embers from the Vallejo fire to jump the strait and ignite brush fires southwest of Crockett, located in Contra Costa County at the opposite end of the Carquinez bridge. The new fire, which was dubbed the "Sky fire," ignited about 9:30 AM and quickly generated so much dense smoke that authorities chose to close the Carquinez bridge to all vehicular traffic in both directions. CHP and county sheriff's office then began to 
evacuate residents from that side of the community. Emergency responders from other cities rushed to the aid of Crockett's own VFD to begin extinguishing the fire, which was reportedly 50 percent contained shortly after noon that day.  The Crockett evacuation order was cancelled and the Carquinez Bridge was reopened to traffic soon after.

Geography

Crockett is located where the Carquinez Strait meets San Pablo Bay.  The Carquinez Bridge, part of Interstate 80, links Crockett with the city of Vallejo to the north across the strait.  To the east of Crockett along the south shore of the strait are Port Costa and the city of Martinez.  South of Crockett are the town of Rodeo and the city of Hercules.  Farther southwest on I-80 are the cities of  Richmond, Berkeley  and Oakland; in the opposite direction, northeast, is the capital of California, Sacramento.

Climate
This region experiences warm (but not hot) and dry summers, with no average monthly temperatures above 71.6 °F.  According to the Köppen Climate Classification system, Crockett has a warm-summer Mediterranean climate, abbreviated "Csb" on climate maps.

Arts and culture

Bailey Art Museum
The Bailey Art Museum features the work of internationally acclaimed sculptor Clayton Bailey, a resident of nearby Port Costa. The  space brings together works from across the artist's five decades plus career featuring examples of Funk art, Nut art, ceramics, and metal sculpture (including robots and space guns), as well as pseudo-scientific curiosities by the artist's alter-ego, Dr. Gladstone. The collection also includes watercolor drawings by Betty Bailey and a gift shop.

Crockett Historical Society

 
The former Crockett railroad station now serves as the home of the Crockett Historical Society.

Demographics

The 2010 United States Census reported that Crockett had a population of 3,094. The racial makeup of Crockett was 2,468 (79.8%) White, 146 (4.7%) African American, 31 (1.0%) Native American, 108 (3.5%) Asian, 24 (0.8%) Pacific Islander, 123 (4.0%) from other races, and 194 (6.3%) from two or more races. Hispanic or Latino of any race were 490 persons (15.8%).

The Census reported that 100% of the population lived in households.

There were 1,446 households, out of which 306 (21.2%) had children under the age of 18 living in them, 554 (38.3%) were opposite-sex married couples living together, 166 (11.5%) had a female householder with no husband present, 77 (5.3%) had a male householder with no wife present.  There were 133 (9.2%) unmarried opposite-sex partnerships, and 22 (1.5%) same-sex married couples or partnerships. 482 households (33.3%) were made up of individuals, and 158 (10.9%) had someone living alone who was 65 years of age or older. The average household size was 2.14.  There were 797 families (55.1% of all households); the average family size was 2.69.

The population consisted of 461 people (14.9%) under the age of 18, 214 people (6.9%) aged 18 to 24, 825 people (26.7%) aged 25 to 44, 1,131 people (36.6%) aged 45 to 64, and 463 people (15.0%) who were 65 years of age or older.  The median age was 45.7 years. For every 100 females, there were 95.9 males.  For every 100 females age 18 and over, there were 95.6 males.

The homeowner vacancy rate was 1.3%; the rental vacancy rate was 10.1%.  1,808 people (58.4% of the population) lived in owner-occupied housing units and 1,286 people (41.6%) lived in rental housing units.

Economy

Crockett is home to the corporate headquarters of C&H Sugar, a subsidiary of American Sugar Refining.

Crockett also contains a fuel storage facility owned by the NuStar Energy L.P. Corporation. Two of these tanks are reserved for containing ethanol, which NuStar blends with other motor fuel components to make low-emissions automobile fuel mandated by California laws.

Education

Crockett is part of the John Swett Unified School District and is home to both Carquinez Middle School and John Swett High School.

The Crockett Library of the Contra Costa County Library is located in Crockett.

Recreation
Crockett is bordered to the south and the east by two regional parks operated by the East Bay Regional Park District.

Crockett Hills Regional Park lies south of Crockett. The 1,939 acre park ranges in elevation from 150 to 800 feet, offering views of San Pablo Bay, the Delta, Mount Tamalpais, and Mount Diablo. Trails include a 4.5-mile segment of the Bay Area Ridge Trail. Crockett Hills is an excellent mountain biking park.

Carquinez Strait Regional Shoreline comprises 1,415 acres of bluffs and shoreline along Carquinez Scenic Drive between the town of Crockett and the hillsides overlooking Martinez.

The topography of Crockett Ranch Regional Park and the adjoining Carquinez Regional Shoreline consists of open, rolling grasslands, wooded ravines, eucalyptus-shaded meadows, and river shoreline. Multi-purpose trails provide access to canyon views and ridgetop vistas.

Notable people
 Aldo Ray (1926–1991), American movie actor (born Aldo Da Re) born in Pennsylvania, who moved to Crockett when he was four years old.  After serving in the U.S. Navy in WWII, returned to Crockett, where he was elected Constable, then left to pursue a movie career.
 Dino Waldren (born 1991), professional rugby player with the United States national rugby union team

Notes

References

External links

Crockett Chamber of Commerce
Crockett Community Foundation
 Bailey Art Museum

Census-designated places in Contra Costa County, California
Carquinez Strait
Company towns in California
Populated places established in 1867
1867 establishments in California
Census-designated places in California